Tina Karol (born Tetiana Hryhorivna Liberman, 25 January 1985) is a Ukrainian singer, actress, and television presenter. She represented Ukraine in the Eurovision Song Contest 2006 with the song "Show Me Your Love", placing seventh. Karol has since become a mentor on The Voice of Ukraine and since 2020 she has also been a judge at Vidbir, Ukraine's National Selection for the Eurovision Song Contest.

Biography 
Born on 25 January 1985 to a Ukrainian mother and Ukrainian Jewish father in Orotukan, Magadan Oblast, Russian Far East. Karol moved to Ivano-Frankivsk, Ukraine at the age of six. Her father, Hryhoriy Liberman was from Vashkivtsi, Ukraine. Karol confessed in 2006 she often felt discriminated against in school because of her Jewish last name. She is fluent in both Ukrainian and Russian. As a teenager Karol (under her real name Tetiana Liberman) performed for four years with the dancing ensemble at the Kyiv branch of the Jewish Agency, and her repertoire included songs in Hebrew and in Yiddish. In 2000 she with this ensemble travelled to the United States, where the group's appearances raised money for Jewish Agency for Israel programs in Ukraine.

In her fourth year, she was awarded a scholarship by Ukraine's parliament. Karol has participated in numerous youth, regional, international and Jewish singing contests as well as musicals and theatrical shows. Karol became the soloist of the Ensemble of Song and Dance of the Ukrainian Armed Forces as well as a television personality. In 2005 she took a less Jewish stage name after producers of New Wave had suggested that to her. In 2006 she commented on this "It was a part of my agreement with the producers, but, to be honest, I am glad I changed my name. I felt like it hindered me in my life."

In 2006 Karol won at the casting for the Eurovision Song Contest 2006 with the song "I Am Your Queen" and therefore represented Ukraine at the event finishing 7th, scoring 145 points, with a revised version of the song entitled "Show Me Your Love". In 2006, Tina Karol released her debut album Show Me Your Love, and another album entitled Nochenka, with some of the songs of the first album in Russian and Ukrainian. Also in 2006, she started studying by correspondence at the National Aviation University in Kyiv. In 2006, she also participated in the United Nations's Unite for Children, Unite Against AIDS campaign against HIV/AIDS in Ukraine.

In 2007, she released her new album Polyus prityazheniya and wrote a fairy tale "Pautinka", a story about a caterpillar, portraying the show business as Tina has experienced it. Philipp Kirkorov, Alla Pugacheva and Verka Serduchka all have "parts" in the story.

On 16 January 2009, President of Ukraine Viktor Yushchenko awarded Karol the title of Honored Artist of Ukraine. In October 2009 she was ranked 92nd in a Top 100 Most Successful Women in Ukraine compiled by experts for the Ukrainian magazine Focus.

In February 2009, she received the Most Beautiful Singer of Ukraine of 2008 award from the organizers of the beauty contest Miss Ukraine Universe-2009. In February 2009, for the second time, she received the title The Most Beautiful Woman of Ukraine according to the readers of the glossy edition Viva!. The premiere of a new song "Ne boysya, malchik" was also held there. In March 2009, two songs – "U neba poprosim" from the album Polyus prityazheniya and a new composition "Lyubol" – became soundtracks for two television series.

In the spring of 2011, together with Sergey Lazarev and the duo Alibi became the host of the music TV show Maidan's.

In the fall of 2012, she served as a contestant coach on Ukrainian reality talent show The Voice Kids, and in the spring of 2013 she went on the 3rd season of The Voice of Ukraine as a coach.

On November 24, 2013, Tina Karol's all-Ukrainian tour kicked off with the solo tour Sila lyubvi i golosa, which ended in late February 2014.

On February 6, 2014, the fifth album Pomnyu was released. On February 14 the premiere of the film The Power of Love and the Voice was held, based on the show of the same name 

March 26, 2014, won the Yuna Music Award in the nomination Best Singer Of The Year. June 1, 2014 opened a charity The Tina Karol Foundation «The Pole of Attraction» to help cancer patients . In 2014, the release of the single "#MNOD" was released, in the same year a music video for this song was released. In 2015, a video for the song "Ya vse yesche lyublyu" appeared on the screens, in the same year she went on a tour with her team in the cities of Ukraine with the performance "Ya vse yesche lyublyu."

In the winter of 2015, Karol came back as a coach on the second season of The Voice Kids the winner of that season was on her team. On the show, she released "Ukraina – tse ty", which she wrote inspired by children on her team. Latter a video with contestants from the show was released. In spring 2015, she came back as a coach on the fifth season of The Voice of Ukraine. March 25, 2015, won Yuna Music Award in the nomination Best Performer. April 28, 2015, on the anniversary of the death of her husband Yevhen Ohir, released a single "Spasibo" 

November 26, 2015, won the M1 Music Awards in the category Best Singer. In winter 2015, she became a star coach in the 6th season of The Voice of Ukraine. In autumn 2016 she became a star coach in the 3rd season of The Voice Kids.

January 22, 2017, President of Ukraine Petro Poroshenko awarded Tina Karol the title of People's Artist of Ukraine.

In winter 2017 she became the star coach in the 7th season of The Voice of Ukraine.

2018 
Tina Karol became the face of Ukraine International Airlines (UIA)

March 8, 2018 released a musical film The Intonations of Tina Karol.

April 26, Tina Karol performed a special performance on the air of The Voice of Ukraine. The Ukrainian pop diva performed songs from its platinum plate Intonatsii.

On July 5 she presented a new concert program in Minsk, Belarus.

On July 27 the Viber company released personal stickers of Tina Karol.

On August 26 the 1+1 TV channel released the premiere of the TV version of Tina Karol's musical concert Intonatsii.

August 27, the premiere of the album Intonatsii (Live).

In the fall of 2018, Tina Karol again took part in the project Shchyrі-2018 from Elle Ukraine.

On November 13, Tina Karol's Big European Tour began (Israel, Italy, Czech Republic, Moldova).

In winter 2018 she became the star coach in the 9th season of The Voice of Ukraine.

On December 7, the premiere of the new song "Sila vysoty."

On December 14, The Crashes won at the Best Shorts Competition International Film Festival in the nomination Best Short Film 2018.

2019 
April 4, Tina Karol and Boombox released "Bezodnya", which became their first joint work. The idea of a sudden creative tandem belongs to the leader of the band Andriy Khlyvniuk.

On  August  22,Tina Karol is back with a brand new single and video clip. The song is entitled "Vabyty" (Attract).

On August 24, Tina Karol took part in the "Procession of Dignity" on the Independence Day of Ukraine. The singer performed a fragment of the national anthem of Ukraine on the roof of the Pyotr Tchaikovsky National Music Academy

In the same month she was the host of “Dancing with the stars” Tantsi z zirkamy. In October, together with the Moldovan singer Dan Balan, she presented the single “Domoy” (Home)  at Dancing with the Stars

In November, Tina Karol became the face and Ambassador  of the Ukrainian jewelry brand Ukrzoloto  In the same month she presented a new video for the song " Idi na zhizn " (Go to life) 

On November 30 Tina Karol and Dan Balan performed the single “Domoy”  at the M1 Music Awards

On December 12, Tina Karol and soloist of The Hardkiss band Julia Sanina presented a duet song “Vilna”  (Free) and music video(clip) for it. This single became the soundtrack to the film “Viddana” 

In December 2019, Tina Karol was included in the list of the 100 most influential Ukrainians by Focus, taking the 85th place.

2020 - 2021 

In winter 2020, she came back as a coach on  The Voice of Ukraine.

On February 8, Tina Karol  became a judge at Vidbir, Ukraine's National Selection for the Eurovision Song Contest. "I am glad to become a member of the jury of the national selection of the Eurovision Song Contest, to be part of a large team of a historical event. Definitely we are a singing nation, we can make world-class music. I’m definitely against setting sports standards for creative people and erasing their personality with the desire of a gold medal. As a result of a long creative journey, music always wins. Together we write history today." On April 26 Tina Karol and Dan Balan on The Voice of Ukraine. presented the song "Pomnish" ( Remember) .  As a coach of Roman Sasanchin, she won The Voice of Ukraine 10 season 

On July 7, President of Ukraine Volodymyr Zelensky awarded Tina Karol with the Order of Princess Olga III degree on the occasion of the Constitution Day of Ukraine

On August 24, Tina, together with Monatik, Irina Bilyk, Oleh Vinnik, Potap and others, took part in the show dedicated to the Independence Day of Ukraine on Sofia Square In the same month, together with Yuri Gorbunov, she again became the host of the show  Tantsi z zirkamy (Dancing with the Stars).

In September, Karol released the album "Nayti svoikh"  (Find Your Own)  and the trilogy-clip of the same name In the same month, Tina Karol was awarded her star plate at the "Star Square" near the Gulliver shopping center in Kyiv .

In November, Tina Karol appeared on the cover of the exclusive edition of the "Ukrainian Women in Vogue" book, published by Vogue Ukraine and dedicated to successful Ukrainian businesswomen.

In December, she released her first shoe collection. It was a collaboration with a Ukrainian brand "Kachorovska", which included three items - open toe shoes, clogs  and micro bags 

On February 12, 2021, she released a music video for the song "Scandal" introducing a whole new repertoire. Later, in winter, she acted as a star coach in a vocal TV-show "The Voice of Ukraine " (Season 11)" on 1+1. In March 2021, together with Potap she became the host at the Lipsync Battle show.

On April 25, during the finale of "The Voice of Ukraine  (Season 11)", Tina Karol declared that she did not plan to be a mentor in the 12th season of the show.

On April 2, she released her eighth album "Krasivo", which included 7 new songs. That same month she presented the live-session "Krasivo" both on her YouTube channel and on 1+1.

On May 12, at the national music awards "YUNA" she was presented a "Special Achievements in Music" award as well as won in two nominations: "Best Movie Soundtrack" (together with Julia Sanina ) and "Best Duet/Collaboration".

On June 16, Tina Karol visited Almaty (Kazakhstan) as part of her promotional tour for the album "Krasivo". There the singer gave several interviews and visited various radio stations.

On June 29, according to Focus magazine Tina Karol was included in "Ukraine's 100 most influential women" list.

On July 1, there was the music video premiere for the song "Krasivo", which is the lead-single of Tina's new album "Krasivo"

On July 5 and 6, 2021, Tina Karol was the headliner of the Atlas Weekend 2021 music festival. She presented a cyber-show in support of her new album "Krasivo". The total number of people in the audience exceeded 250 thousand .

On July 30, the live album "Tina Karol - Cyber   Show Atlas Weekend 2021 Live" was released. Musicians both from the USA and Ukraine worked on the music and arrangements in the album

On August 13, Tina Karol released the duet song "Zirochka" with the Ukrainian group KAZKA. This was the first track from her Ukrainian-language duet album "Moloda Krov", the release of which is dedicated to the 30th anniversary of the Independence Day of Ukraine.

On August 20, Tina released the album "Moloda Krov" featuring 7 duet songs.

On August 22, Tina Karol together with Natalia Mogilevskaya, Jamala, Sergey Babkin, Olga Polyakova and others performed at the award ceremony of the Presidential Prize "National Legend of Ukraine", established for the Independence Day of Ukraine. The ceremony took place in the Mariinskyi Palace.

On August 24, 2021, Tina Karol together with Andrea Bocelli performed the song "Con te partirò" at Constitution Square. On the same evening, a large-scale musical show "Independence is in our DNA" took place at the NSC Olympiyskiy stadium, where Tina performed a medley of her hits. Tina Karol also performed the song "Ukraina ce ty" at the ceremony dedicated to the 30th anniversary of the NOC.

On October 28, Tina Karol released a music video for the song "Dvoinoy Rai" on her YouTube channel. The single was included in the singer's new album that was released on October 29. On November 9, 2021, Tina Karol went to Kazakhstan to promote her new mini-album "Dvoinoy Rai". There she gave a number of interviews to central TV channels and radio stations.

On November 16, Tina Karol performed her Ukrainian-language hit “Namaluu Tobiі” on "Dancing with the Stars" in Georgia.

On November 23, 2021, together with Kamila Zhusupova, she became the host of the first screenlife singing contest in Kazakhstan called "Double Dauys"

On December 31, 2021, Tina Karol was hiding under the mask of the Snow Queen  in a TV-show "New Year's Mask" on "Ukraina" channel. She performed the song "Snezhinka" from the movie "Charodei".

2022 
On January 14, in the final of the show "Dancing with the Stars" in Georgia, she sang in a duet with the Georgian performer Anri Jokhadze. The duo surprised with a new version of Tina's hit "Krasivo".

On January 17, 2022, Karol released the concert film “Krasivo. Begu na svet"  In February, she became the host of the Talent Games entertainment show along with Mikhailo Khoma and Julia Sanina. In February, she became a judge of the National Vidbir for Eurovision On February 16, together with Mikhailo Poplavsky, she became the host of the "Ukrainian Song of the Year " National music award. Tina received an award in the nomination "Legend of Ukrainian Song".

After the Russian military invasion of Ukraine, on February 24, Tina decided to leave the country and go to Poland, after the first explosions thundered at her house in the suburbs of Kyiv. Together with like-minded people, she created the International Center for Information Resistance, headquartered in Warsaw, to cover the events that are taking place in Ukraine, with a focus on the Russian-speaking audience from Russia, Belarus, Armenia and Kazakhstan

On March 30, a charity concert in support of Ukraine was held in Warsaw, where Tina Karol performed the Anthem of Ukraine. All collected money for tickets was donated to Unicef for the needs of Ukrainian children. The event was held with the support of the Embassy of Ukraine in the Poland at the ROMA theater in Warsaw. On April 12, a charity match "Match For Peace" was held in Poland at the Legia stadium in support of Ukraine. Dynamo (Kyiv) and Legia (Warsaw) met at the stadium. During the break, Ukrainian singers Tina Karol, Nadya Dorofeeva, Kateryna Pavlenko (Go_A) and Julia Sanina (The Hardkiss) sang on the football field. Karol sang the song "Ukraina - Tse Ty", and also, the singers jointly performed the compositions "Vilna" and "Chervona Kalina" On April 22, Tina Karol performed at the opening of the exhibition "This is Ukraine: Defending Freedom", which is part of the official program of the Venice Biennale, where the singer sang the National Anthem of Ukraine.

On May 8, in Berlin, Tina Karol and Ukrainian Ambassador to Germany Andriy Melnyk took part in a commemorative flower-laying ceremony at the memorial in the Tiergarten on the occasion of the Day of Remembrance and Reconciliation, as well as the 77th anniversary of the liberation of Europe from National Socialism. The singer also sang the Ukrainian Anthem together with the Ukrainian community

On May 10, Tina Karol arrived in Tokyo (Japan) on the mission of a public ambassador, at the invitation of the Japanese businessman and philanthropist Hiroshi Mikitani . Karol performed as a special guest at a concert in support of Ukraine, which took place on May 14, as part of the Rakuten Girls Awards 2022   On May 15, the singer visited Hiroshima, where she met with the mayor of the city Kazumi Matsui, as well as with officials and diplomats of the country On May 19, within the framework of the 75th Cannes Film Festival, a charity evening was organized by the Golden Globe in support of the Ukrainian film industry Tina Karol became a special guest of the charity evening, the singer performed her Ukrainian-language song "Namalyuyu tobi zori".

On August 24, for the Independence Day of Ukraine, Tina Karol surprised Ukrainians by performing the National Anthem in a rather unusual format. As part of the VOGUE VOICES OF NATION project, the artist arranged a 4D performance and appeared in the form of a hologram.

In August Tina Karol became the voice of the collection of the Ukrainian brand Lever Couture, which was worked on by designer Lesya Verlinghieri and creative director of Lady Gaga singer Nicola Formichetti. Especially for the show, the performer created an electronic mini-album LELEKA, imbued with Ukrainian ethnicity and folklore. Tina Karol worked on new songs in collaboration with the American DJ Macro/Micro.

On September 16, Karol presented a new Ukrainian-language single “VILNI.NESKORENI”

On September 23, at a charity evening within the framework of the 77th UN General Assembly, which was held at the Metropolitan Opera in New York, which brought together many world political and business leaders, the presentation of the Olena Zelenska Foundation took place. During the event, Tina Karol and Julia Sanina performed "Vilna" 

On September 30, Tina Karol presented the English-language album "Scandal".  In September–October 2022, a North American tour was held in the cities of USA and Canada . In October, Tina Karol presented the English-language album "Scandal" at a concert in Los Angeles, USA  

December 31, 2022 Tina Karol took part in the main New Year's concert, which took place in Berlin, Germany at the foot of the Brandenburg Gate. Karol took the stage with the legendary German band Alphaville. Together they performed the group's famous hit "Forever Young". The concert took place in the open air and was broadcast live on German television.

The Tina Karol Foundation «The Pole of Attraction» 
The Tina Karol Foundation «The Pole of Attraction» is a charity initiative of the singer, which aims to help children oncology departments of city and regional hospitals in all cities of Ukraine.

Assistance is provided directly to the oncology department of the hospital in purchasing and providing the necessary equipment or medicines.

The list of cities is constantly expanding. Each new city that will be assisted and is currently awaiting the foundation's mission will be listed on the page of the foundation on the singer's website.

The list of assistance already provided is also being complemented and updated.

The Charitable Foundation «The Pole of Attraction» is not a fundraising organization and operates solely through funding from the singer herself: Tina Karol donates funds to the Foundation from solo concerts in the music halls.

Tina Karol says:“There is only one and the most important motivation in my idea to create such a Foundation - it is care. Having experienced this, I understand how lonely parents and children who suffer from this terrible plague of the 21st century feel. I want to bring a little joy, warmth and care to their lives. The overriding goal of my initiative is to inspire people to do good deeds."The Tina Karol Charity Foundation «The Pole of Attraction» was founded on June 1, 2014 on Children's Day.

Personal life 
On 15 June 2008 Tina married her producer Yevhen Ohir (1980—2013). On 18 November 2008 Karol gave birth to their only child, a son named Veniamin Ohir.

Tina's husband Ohir died on 28 April 2013 from stomach cancer at the age of 32.

When asked by the Jewish Telegraphic Agency in 2006 whether she identifies as a Jew she replied "I don't like talking about self-identifications, I feel simply a human being, who came to this world to make a change. There was a period in my life when I was deciding on my religious beliefs, but now I think I've found my stand on this. I believe in God, but I don't identify with any particular religion."

Discography

Studio albums

Extended plays

Live albums

Compilation albums

Singles

Other songs 
 "Ya Budu Tebya Tselovat" (with B.Stone)
 "Posvyashchenie v Albom"
 "Misyats'"
 "Letniy Roman" (with B.Stone)
 "Dusha" (with О.Gavriluk)
 "Heal the World" (Ukrainian Stars, in memory of Michael Jackson)
 "Kartina Lubvi" ("New Wave" festival 2005, Latvia)

See also 
Ukraine in the Eurovision Song Contest 2006

Notes

References

External links

 
Tina Karol Foundation 

1985 births
Living people
People from Yagodninsky District
Eurovision Song Contest entrants for Ukraine
Eurovision Song Contest entrants of 2006
Ukrainian Jews
21st-century Ukrainian women singers
Jewish women singers
Ukrainian pop singers
Recipients of the title of Merited Artist of Ukraine
Ukrainian sopranos
English-language singers from Ukraine
Jewish Ukrainian musicians
R. Glier Kyiv Institute of Music alumni